was a Japanese daimyō of the late Edo period, who ruled the Owari Domain. He was the third son of Tokugawa Yoshikatsu, who was the 14th daimyō of Owari by Otama no Kata. His childhood name was Motochiyo (元千代).

1858 births
1875 deaths
Lords of Owari
Meiji Restoration